The 1992 Mid-Continent Conference men's basketball tournament was held March 8–10, 1992 in Cleveland, Ohio.[2] This was the ninth edition of the tournament for the Association of Mid-Continent Universities, now known as the Summit League.

Bracket

References

1991–92 Mid-Continent Conference men's basketball season
Summit League men's basketball tournament
1992 in sports in Ohio